Agathe Laisné (born 26 May 1999) is a French professional golfer. She won the 2017 European Ladies Amateur and the 2023 Florida's Natural Charity Classic.

Amateur career
Laisné was born in Paris and played for the French National Team since the age of 13. She represented France at the 2015 Junior Golf World Cup, the Espirito Santo Trophy in 2016 and 2018, the European Ladies' Team Championship four times and the European Girls' Team Championship three times, winning the event in 2014.

She also represented Europe at the Junior Vagliano Trophy and the Junior Solheim Cup in 2015.

Laisné excelled individually and in 2013 won the Belgian International Under 18, in 2014 the Championnat de France des Jeunes Minimes (Girls 15-16), Total International Juniors of Belgium, and the European Ladies Club Trophy. In 2015 she tied for second at the 2015 Orange Bowl and in 2016 she won the Coupe Didier Illouz. She received one of the four invitations for the 2015 Evian Championship and again for the 2017 Evian Championship.

In 2017 she won the European Ladies Amateur by one stroke ahead of Albane Valenzuela, and two strokes ahead of Morgane Metraux, to also qualify for the 2018 Women's British Open. In 2020 she won both the Grand Prix du Medoc and Grand Prix de Saint Germain.

Laisné attended the University of Texas at Austin 2017–2021 where she majored in finance and played with Texas Longhorns women's golf. She won the 2019 Big 12 Conference Championship, becoming the third person in University of Texas history to claim the Big 12 title. She was an Arnold Palmer Cup International team member in 2019 and 2021.

After a pair of victories in the LET Access Series, the Santander Golf Tour Lauro in Spain and Lavaux Ladies Open in Switzerland, Laisné surged to number 13 in the Women's World Amateur Golf Ranking, to qualify for the 2020 U.S. Women's Open. She finished third at the 2020 European Ladies Amateur, one stroke away from playoff.

Professional career
Laisné turned professional in October 2021. She earned her card for the 2022 LPGA Tour through qualifying school. In her rookie season, she made 3 cuts in 18 starts with a best finish of T16 at the Palos Verdes Championship. She also made her fist cut in a major, at the 2022 Evian Championship.

Relegated to the Epson Tour for 2023, Laisné won the Florida's Natural Charity Classic, the first event of the season. She shot a bogey-free 66 to come from six shots back to join a playoff with Jillian Hollis and Kiira Riihijärvi, and won with a birdie on the first playoff hole.

Amateur wins
2013 Belgian International Under 18
2014 Championnat de France des Jeunes Minimes (Girls 15-16), Total International Juniors of Belgium, European Ladies Club Trophy
2016 Coupe Didier Illouz
2017 European Ladies Amateur
2019 Big 12 Championship (individual)
2020 Grand Prix du Medoc, Grand Prix de Saint Germain

Source:

Professional wins (3)

Epson Tour wins (1)

LET Access Series wins (2)

Results in LPGA majors
Results not in chronological order.

CUT = missed the half-way cut
NT = No tournament

Team appearances
Amateur
Junior Vagliano Trophy (representing the Continent of Europe): 2015 (winners)
Junior Solheim Cup (representing Europe): 2015
Toyota Junior Golf World Cup (representing France): 2015
Espirito Santo Trophy (representing France): 2016, 2018
European Girls' Team Championship (representing France): 2014 (winners), 2015, 2017
European Ladies' Team Championship (representing France): 2016, 2018, 2020, 2021
Arnold Palmer Cup (representing the International team): 2019 (winners), 2021

Source:

References

External links

French female golfers
LPGA Tour golfers
Texas Longhorns women's golfers
Golfers from Paris
1999 births
Living people
21st-century French women